Patricia Harris is the former Deputy Mayor of New York City.

Patricia Harris may also refer to:

Patricia Roberts Harris (1924–1985), Carter Administration cabinet member
Patricia Harris, in 2005 New Year Honours
Pat Butcher aka Patricia Harris, character in EastEnders

See also
Pat Harris (disambiguation)